WTTY (97.7 FM) is a commercial radio station licensed in the US to Ty Ty, Georgia. WTTY is part of a group of Mount Olive Broadcasting Group playing Urban Adult Contemporary Music, branded as 97.7 The Beat, since 2022.  It airs the Steve Harvey Morning Show.

References
 
 WTTY. "FCC Consumation", Federal Communications Commission, 09/30/2015.
 WTTY. "FCC Ownership Info", Federal Communications Commission, 12/01/2015.

External links

TTY
Radio stations established in 2015
2015 establishments in Georgia (U.S. state)